This is a list of the 52 members of the European Parliament for Poland in the 2019 to 2024 session.

These MEPs were elected at the 2019 European Parliament election in Poland.

List 

On the Law and Justice list: (ECR)
Adam Bielan
Joachim Brudziński
Richard Czarnecki
Anna Fotyga
Patryk Jaki (United Poland)
Krzysztof Jurgiel
Karol Karski
Beata Kempa
Izabela Kloc
Joanna Kopcińska
Zdzisław Krasnodębski (independent)
Elżbieta Kruk
Zbigniew Kuźmiuk
Ryszard Legutko
Beata Mazurek
Andżelika Możdżanowska
Tomasz Poręba
Elżbieta Rafalska
Bogdan Rzońca
Jacek Saryusz-Wolski
Beata Szydło
Grzegorz Tobiszowski
Witold Waszczykowski
Jadwiga Wiśniewska
Anna Zalewska
Kosma Złotowski
Dominik Tarczyński – since 1 February 2020

On the Spring list: (S&D)
Robert Biedroń
Łukasz Kohut
Sylwia Spurek (independent)

On the European Coalition list:

Civic Platform (EPP Group)
Magdalena Adamowicz
Bartosz Arłukowicz
Jerzy Buzek
Jarosław Duda
Tomasz Frankowski
Andrzej Halicki
Danuta Hübner
Ewa Kopacz
Janusz Lewandowski
Elżbieta Łukacijewska
Janina Ochojska (independent)
Jan Olbrycht
Radosław Sikorski
Róża von Thun und Hohenstein

Democratic Left Alliance (S&D)
Marek Balt
Marek Belka
Włodzimierz Cimoszewicz
Bogusław Liberadzki
Leszek Miller

Polish People's Party (EPP Group)
Krzysztof Hetman
Adam Jarubas
Jarosław Kalinowski

References

See also 

 List of members of the European Parliament, 2019–2024

Lists of Members of the European Parliament for Poland
Lists of Members of the European Parliament 2019–2024
MEPs for Poland 2019–2024